Östergötland Runic Inscription 43 or Ög 43 is the Rundata catalog number for a Viking Age runic inscription that is carved on a rockface in Ingelstad, which is just north of Norrköping, Östergötland, Sweden.

Description
The inscription Ög 43 is carved on a granite rockface consisting of two lines of text within runic text bars that are approximately 0.4 meters in length. Above the inscription is carved a sword, and a cross and nordic sun symbol are also carved nearby. The runic text is in the younger futhark except for the first rune in the second line, which uses the form of the d-rune, from the elder futhark. The Rök runestone, which is dated to this same period, also mixes runes from both futharks in its inscription. Because of this, this inscription has been dated to approximately 850 C.E. The association of the carving of a sun with the word sól along with the use of an anachronistic d-rune may suggest that the inscription is a ritualistic comparison of the winter sun and the bright summer sun, and represents an encrypted magical call for the sun to shine.

The d-rune of the second line has been transcribed into Old Norse as an ideogram that uses the name for this rune, which means "day," as the personal name Dagr. This name also appears spelled out in the runic texts on inscriptions Vg 101 in Bragnum and Vg 113 in Lärkegapet, and Dagr is also the personification of day in Norse mythology.

Inscription

Transliteration of the runes into Latin characters
÷ salsi karþi sul ÷ D ÷ skut- - þ--a hiu ×

Transcription into Old Norse
Sôlsi gerði sól. Dagr(?) skút[a(?) í(?)] þ[ett]a(?) hjó.

Translation in English
Sôlsi(?) made(?) the sun(?). Dagr(?) cut(?) this(?) on the cliff-face.

Gallery

See also
Runic magic

References

Runestones in Östergötland
9th-century inscriptions